Pirates: Captain's Quest is a 1997 educational adventure video game. In Spain the game was published by Zeta Multimedia.

Plot 
The game allows the player to experience the life of a pirate with activities such as sword fighting, navigation, island conquering, and digging for buried treasure.

Gameplay 
Primarily an adventure game (due to requiring players to hunt for items and gather knowledge from characters to complete puzzles), the title contains 47 levels. It also contains minigames in other genres.

Critical reception 
Andy Backer of Computer Games Magazine positively compared it to Microprose's similarly-themed title Pirates Gold. J.P. Faber of U.S. Kids deemed it "terrifically fun" due to creating a historically authentic atmosphere. Daily Record thought the game would keep kids entertained for hours, while educating them in the process.

References 

1997 video games
Adventure games
Educational video games
Classic Mac OS games
Video games about pirates
Video games developed in the United States
Video games set in the Caribbean
Windows games